Bryan M. Cantrill (born 1973) is an American software engineer who worked at Sun Microsystems and later at Oracle Corporation following its acquisition of Sun. He left Oracle on July 25, 2010, to become the Vice President of Engineering at Joyent, transitioning to Chief Technology Officer at Joyent in April 2014, until his departure on July 31 of 2019. He is now the CTO of Oxide Computer company.

Professional life 
Cantrill was born in Vermont, later moving to Colorado, where he attained the rank of Eagle Scout. He studied computer science at Brown University, spending two summers at QNX Software Systems doing kernel development. Upon completing his B.Sc. in 1996, he immediately joined Sun Microsystems to work with Jeff Bonwick in the Solaris Performance Group.

In 2005 Bryan Cantrill was named one of the 35 Top Young Innovators by Technology Review, MIT's magazine. Cantrill was included in the TR35 list for his development of DTrace, a function of the OS Solaris 10 that provides a non-invasive means for real-time tracing and diagnosis of software. Sun technologies and technologists, including DTrace and Cantrill, also received an InfoWorld Innovators Award that year. In 2006, "The DTrace trouble-shooting software from Sun was chosen as the Gold winner in The Wall Street Journal's 2006 Technology Innovation Awards contest." In 2008, Cantrill, Mike Shapiro and Adam Leventhal were recognized with the USENIX Software Tools User Group (STUG) award for "the provision of a significant enabling technology."

Together with Shapiro and Leventhal, Cantrill founded Fishworks, a stealth project within Sun Microsystems which produced the Sun Storage 7000 Unified Storage Systems.

He left Oracle on July 25, 2010, to become the Vice President of Engineering at Joyent. He announced his transition to being Chief Technology Officer at Joyent in April 2014, and held that position until announcing his departure as of July 31 of 2019. He is now the CTO of Oxide Computer company

He was a member of the ACM Queue Editorial Board.

Controversies and opinions 
During an online technical discussion of Solaris with Linux kernel developer David S. Miller in 1996, Cantrill responded to Miller's lengthy comment with a one-line reply, "Have you ever kissed a girl?"  In 2015, during a discussion concerning Ben Noordhuis's departure from the Node.js project, Cantrill said that the 1996 comment continues to be cited, decades later, and wrote about his regrets in sending the response, which he called "stupid".

After Cantrill left Oracle in 2010 he compared the company's behavior to the Nazis'.

Cantrill announced at FISL 2012 his strong preference for permissive open source software licenses over copyleft licenses by calling the copyleft GPL license family "anti-collaborative" and "viral."

Articles

References

External links 
 
 

Living people
Open source people
American computer scientists
American computer programmers
Solaris people
Brown University alumni
1974 births
Sun Microsystems people
American chief technology officers
American software engineers